NFL playoff results is a listing of the year-by-year results of the NFL Playoff games to determine the final two teams for the championship game. The winners of those games are listed in NFL Championship Game article. The overall franchise records are shown in the last table.

NFL playoff game results 1933–1966
Beginning with the 1933 season, the NFL featured a championship game, played between the winners of its two divisions.  In this era, if there was a tie for first place in the division at the end of the regular season, a one-game playoff was used to determine the team that would represent their division in the NFL Championship Game.  This happened nine times during this era.

Teams who went on to win the NFL Championship Game that season .

NFL Conference Championship game results 1967–1969
For the 1967 season, the NFL split into four divisions (two conferences of two divisions each).  Each of the four division champions played in their respective Conference Championship Game, with those winners advancing to the NFL Championship Game.  1967 was the first year where a pre-scheduled playoff (rather than regular season results) determined participation in the championship.  It also marked the first year in which if there was a tie for first place in a division, the division champion was determined by a system of tiebreakers, rather than via a playoff game (as detailed in the 1933–1966 era above).

NFL Championship winner , who then faced the AFL champion in the AFL-NFL World Championship Game (later to be known as the Super Bowl)

NFL Wild Card Round game results 1978–present
In 1978, the NFL expanded its playoffs pool from 8 to 10 teams, requiring the addition of another round of playoffs.  From 1978–1989, this round featured one game per conference between the two wild-card (non-division winners) and thus the name "Wild Card" round.  In 1982, the league held a 16-team tournament due to the players strike, which reduced the regular season to just 9 games.  The playoffs expanded to 12 teams for the 1990 season, and again to 14 teams for the 2020 season, with an additional game added to this week in each year.

Teams who later went on to win the Super Bowl that season . Home teams in italics.

NFL Divisional Round game results 1970–present
Starting with the 1970 merger with the American Football League the NFL expanded its playoffs to 8 teams total.  The round of 8 has traditionally been known as the "Divisional" round.

Teams who later went on to win the Super Bowl that season .

NFL Conference Championship game results 1970–present
Note: Since the AFL-NFL Merger, the playoffs have generally been held over two calendar years.  For example, the Indianapolis Colts are regarded as the 2006 NFL Champions even though the Super Bowl was in February 2007.Super Bowl winners .

All-time playoff records (NFL/AFL)

Updated through the 2022-23 playoffs

References

External links

 
Playoff results